The Holy Cross Church, also known as Hanga Roa Church or simply Catholic Church of Hanga Roa is the name of the religious building affiliated with the Catholic Church in the "Te Pito Te Henua" Street in the city of Hanga Roa, the capital and greater city of the Easter Island, a Territory of Chile in the Pacific Ocean.

The temple that follows the Roman or Latin rite was established in 1937 being its first priest Father Sebástian Englert. The building stands out for its external decoration and the gardens that surround it. Mainly remarkable is its facade that mixes Christian religious motifs and native elements.

It offers masses in Spanish and you can hear songs in the Rapa Nui language. In the inner part there are images carved locally that represent Christian saints, Jesus Christ and the Virgin Mary.

The religious services are attended by both Catholic faithful and tourists attracted by the architecture of the site.

Burials

Angata
Eugène Eyraud
Nicolás Pakarati
Sebastian Englert

See also
Roman Catholicism in Chile
Holy Cross

References

Roman Catholic churches in Easter Island
Roman Catholic churches completed in 1937
Hanga Roa
20th-century Roman Catholic church buildings in Chile